Sir William Hay Macnaghten, 1st Baronet (24 August 179323 December 1841), was a British civil servant in India, who played a major part in the First Anglo-Afghan War.

Life
William was the second son of Sir Francis Macnaghten, Baronet, judge of the supreme courts of Madras and Calcutta, and was educated at Charterhouse. He went to Madras as a cadet in 1809, but in 1816 joined the Bengal Civil Service. He displayed a talent for languages and published several treatises on Hindu and Islamic law. His political career began in 1830 as secretary to Lord William Bentinck; and, in 1837, he became one of the most trusted advisers of the governor-general, Lord Auckland, with whose policy of supporting Shah Shuja against Dost Mahommed Khan, the reigning amir of Kabul, Macnaghten became closely identified.

He was created a baronet in 1840, and four months before his death was nominated to the governorship of Bombay.  

As a political agent at Kabul, he came into conflict with the military authorities and subsequently with his subordinate Sir Alexander Burnes. Macnaghten attempted to placate the Afghan chiefs with heavy subsidies, but when the drain on the Indian exchequer became too great, and the allowances were reduced, this policy led to an outbreak. Burnes was murdered on 2 November 1841; and under the elderly General William Elphinstone, the British army in Kabul degenerated into a leaderless mob.

Macnaghten tried to save the situation by negotiating with the Afghan chiefs and, independently of them, with Dost Mahammad's son, Akbar Khan, by whom he was captured and, on 23 December 1841, Macnaghten was killed. The exact circumstances of his death are unclear; Khan himself may have killed him personally, or that he was killed because he was resisting after being captured and it was feared he would break free.

This soon became an inspirational story among the Afghans, with the disastrous retreat from Kabul and the Massacre of Elphinstone's army in the Khurd-Kabul Pass following. These events threw doubt on Macnaghten's capacity for dealing with the problems of colonial diplomacy.

Works

Macnaghten produced one of the principal editions of the Thousand and One Nights, known as the Calcutta II edition.

Appearances in fiction 

Macnaghten appears in the first volume of the Flashman Papers, being depicted as ambitious, arrogant and a megalomaniac.

He also appears in To Herat and Cabul by G. A. Henty. He is pictured as a brave man, but clueless about Afghan politics. Henty places the blame for convincing Lord Auckland, the Governor-General of India, to place Shuja on the throne squarely on his shoulders.

References

 
  

1793 births
1841 deaths
People educated at Charterhouse School
Baronets in the Baronetage of the United Kingdom
British people of the First Anglo-Afghan War
People of the First Anglo-Afghan War
British diplomats
Assassinated British diplomats
Administrators in British India
British military personnel of the First Anglo-Afghan War
Great Game
19th-century British diplomats